The AeA (formerly the American Electronics Association) was a nationwide non-profit trade association that represented all segments of the technology industry. It lobbied governments at the state, federal, and international levels; provided access to capital and business opportunities; and offered select business services and networking programs.

In 2008, the AeA merged with the Information Technology Association of America (ITAA) to form TechAmerica.

History
AeA was founded in 1943 by David Packard and 25 of Hewlett-Packard's suppliers to help lobby for government contracts. It was originally named the West Coast Electronic Manufacturers Association (WCEMA). In 1969, WCEMA changed its name to the Western Electronic Manufacturers Association (WEMA) to reflect the growing membership outside California. In 1977, the association once again changed its name to the American Electronics Association, in an effort to more accurately represent its 750 members nationwide. A final name change occurred in 2001, as the American Electronics Association was shortened to AeA with the tagline "Advancing the Business of Technology."

AeA had 18 offices across the United States, and had two international offices in Brussels and Beijing. AeA had nearly 2,500 corporate members (and the 1.8 million employees they represent nationwide) at the time of the merger. The membership was drawn from a wide range of high tech sectors, including the aerospace/defense, business related services, computers, medical equipment, semiconductors/electronic components, software, and telecommunications industries.

Since 1959, AeA has awarded an annual Medal of Achievement to a recipient selected for contributions and advances within the high-tech industry, their community, and humankind.

AeA also produced an annual Cyberstates report which quantifies the high-tech industry on a state-by-state basis in the United States.

On September 11, 2008, The Boards of Directors of AeA and the Information Technology Association of America (ITAA) announced that they are in discussions to merge the trade associations’ memberships and programs.

On December 9, 2008, the Boards of Directors of AeA and ITAA announced that they have each approved the merger of the two trade associations' memberships and programs. The combined associations became TechAmerica (The Technology Association of America) on January 1, 2009.

Chair & Board of Directors 
Peter J. Boni is the Chairperson of the AeA Board of Directors and the President and CEO of Safeguard Scientifics, Inc.

As President and Chief Executive Officer of Safeguard, Peter J. Boni is responsible for developing and executing Safeguard’s corporate strategy.

In addition to acting as CEO for several publicly traded and privately held companies, he has served as a chairman, a Fortune 500 corporate executive, a NYSE Fortune 1000 president, a management consultant, board member, investor and advisor to institutional investors in both early- and later-stage hardware, software and technology-enabled services firms. After his CEO experience, Peter served as an Operating Partner at Advent International, a leading global private equity firm managing $10 billion.

Select companies represented on the Board include Agilent, Citrix, Intel, Microsoft, Motorola, Symantec, and Xerox.

Senior staff at the time of the merger

President & Chief Executive OfficerChristopher Hansen

Financial OperationsSamuel J. BlockVice President/Controller

Government AffairsRobert J. MulliganSenior Vice President International

LegalBenjamin AdersonAssociation Counsel and Secretary

OperationsMatthew KazmierczakSenior Vice President, Operations

ServicesElaine SandersSenior Vice President for Financial Conferences, Executive Education, and Affinity Programs

Eric MeyerSenior Vice President for Insurance Programs

AeA's Regional Offices 
AeA's main offices were located in Washington, DC and in Silicon Valley, CA. AeA had a total network of 18 offices across the country and two overseas.

Sources

External links 
 TechAmerica

Technology trade associations
Lobbying organizations in the United States
Organizations established in 1943
1943 establishments in the United States
Trade associations based in the United States
Defunct organizations based in the United States
Organizations disestablished in 2009
2009 disestablishments in the United States
Entertainment companies of the United States